Ommanney is a surname, and may refer to:

 Catherine "Cat" Ommanney, a castmember of The Real Housewives of Washington, D.C.
 Charles Ommanney (fl. 2010), photojournalist for Newsweek
 Erasmus Ommanney (1814–1904), Royal Navy officer and Arctic explorer
 F. D. Ommanney (born 1903), author of books on travel and nature including Life Nature Library's The Fishes
Francis Ommanney (1774–1840), English politician
 George Campbell Ommanney (died 1936), vicar at St Matthew's Church, Sheffield, England
 Henry Mortlock Ommanney (1816–1880), discoverer, surveyor and namesake of Mortlock River, Western Australia
 John Ommanney (1773–1855), Royal Navy officer and Commander-in-Chief, Plymouth.
 Montagu Ommanney (1842–1925), British civil servant and Head of the Colonial Office
 Richard Ommanney (born March 14, 1948), English screenwriter known for sitcom